This is an incomplete list of Acts of the Parliament of Ireland for the years from 1701 to 1800.  See also the List of Acts of the Parliament of Ireland to 1700.

The number shown by each Act's title is its chapter number. Acts are cited using this number, preceded by the year(s) of the reign during which the relevant parliamentary session was held; thus the Act concerning assay passed in 1783 is cited as "23 & 24 Geo. 3 c. 23", meaning the 23rd Act passed during the session that started in the 23rd year of the reign of George III and which finished in the 24th year of that reign.  Note that the modern convention is to use Arabic numerals in citations (thus "40 Geo. 3" rather than "40 Geo. III").  Acts of the reign of Elizabeth I are formally cited without a regnal numeral in the Republic of Ireland.

Acts passed by the Parliament of Ireland did not have a short title; however, some of these Acts have subsequently been given a short title by Acts of the Parliament of the United Kingdom, Acts of the Parliament of Northern Ireland, or Acts of the Oireachtas.  This means that some Acts have different short titles in the Republic of Ireland and Northern Ireland respectively.

A number of the Acts included in this list are still in force in Northern Ireland or the Republic of Ireland.  Because these two jurisdictions are entirely separate, the version of an Act in force in one may differ from the version in force in the other; similarly, an Act may have been repealed in one but not in the other.

A number of Acts passed by the Parliament of England or the Parliament of Great Britain also extended to Ireland during this period.

1701–1710

2 Anne (1703)

 c. 1 An act for an additional duty of excise upon beer, ale, and other liquors
 c. 2 An act for encouraging the importation of iron and staves
 c. 3 An Act to prevent Popish Priests from coming into this Kingdom
 c. 4 An act for continuing the additional duty of excise on beer, ale and other liquours
 c. 5 An Act to make it High Treason in this Kingdom to impeach the Succession of the Crown, as limited by several Acts of Parliament - known in NI as the "Treason Act (Ireland) 1703" (still in force in UK)
 c. 6 An Act to prevent the further Growth of Popery - known as the "Popery Act"
 c. 7 An Act for registering the Popish Clergy - known as the "Registration Act"
 c. 8 Plus Lands Act 1703
 c. 9 An act for quieting ecclesiastical persons in their possessions
 c. 10 An act for the exchange of glebes belonging to churches in this kingdom
 c. 11 An act for building several parish churches in more convenient places
 c. 12 An act for the reviving an act for taking away the benefit of clergy in some cases; and for transporting felons
 c. 13 An act for continuing two acts against tories, robbers, and rapparees
 c. 14 An Act for naturalizing of all Protestant strangers in this kingdom
 c. 15 Sale of Livestock Act 1703
 c. 16 An act for reducing of interest of money to eight per cent for the future
 c. 17 An act to supply the defects of an act past in the seventh year of the late King William, intituled, An act for the better regulating of measures in and throughout this kingdom
 c. 18 An act for the recovery of small debts
 c. 19 An act for erecting a workhouse in the city of Dublin

4 Anne (1705)

 c. 1 An act for granting to her Majesty an additional duty on beer, etc
 c. 2 An Act to explain and amend an Act, intituled An Act for registering the popish clergy
 c. 8 Tolls Act 1705
 c. 11 Sale of Horses Act 1705
 c. 12 Royal Mines Act 1705 (still in force in UK)
 c. 14 Weights and Measures Act 1705

6 Anne (1707)

 c. 2 Registration of Deeds Act 1707
 c. 4 Act to prevent the destroying and murthering of Bastard Children
 c. 6 An Act to explain and amend an Act, intituled, An Act to prevent Papists being Solicitors
 c. 7 Sheriffs Act 1707
 c. 8 An Act for explaining and limiting the Privileges of Parliament
 c. 10 Administration of Justice Act 1707
 c. 11 An Act for explaining and amending two several acts against tories, robbers, and rapparees
 c. 14 An Act to prevent the Disorders that may happen by the marching of Soldiers, and for providing Carriages for the Baggage of Soldiers in their march
 c. 15 Outlawry
 c. 17 Lotteries and Gaming-Tables
 c. 19 Marsh's Library Act 1707
 c. 21 St Anne's Parish Act 1707

8 Anne (1709)

 c. 3 An Act for explaining and amending an Act intituled, An Act to prevent the further Growth of Popery
 c. 5 An Act to prevent Delays of Proceedings at the Assizes and Sessions
 c. 10 Registration of Deeds Act 1709
 c. 21 Copyright Act 1709 ("the Statute of Anne") An Act for the Encouragement of Learning, by vesting the Copies of Printed Books in the Authors or purchasers of such Copies, during the Times therein mentioned

9 Anne (1710)

 c. 6 Criminal Evidence Act 1710
 c. 8 An Act for the better securing of rents and to prevent frauds committed by tenants

1711–1720

11 Anne (1712)

 c. 2 Distress for Rent Act 1712
 c. 5 Gaming
 c. 6 Lotteries
 c. 8 Sheriffs Act 1712

2 Geo. 1 (1715)

 c. 5 Accidental Fires
 c. 8 County Palatine of Tipperary Act 1715
 c. 9 An Act to make the Militia of this Kingdom more useful
 c. 10 An Act to restrain Papists from being High or Petty Constables, and for the better Regulating the Parish Watches
 c. 11 Recovery of small debts in certain actions
 c. 12 Draining and improving the bogs
 c. 14 An Act for Real Union and Division of Parishes
 c. 16 Packing of Tallow Act 1715
 c. 17 Servants Act 1715
 c. 18 An Act for preventing abuses and deceits in His Majesty's Revenue, by the importing of Brandy in small quantities
 c. 19 An Act for the more effectual preventing fraudulent Conveyances, in order to multiply Votes for electing Members to serve in Parliament; and for preventing the irregular Proceedings of Sheriffs, and other officers in electing and returning such Members
 c. 20 Slander
 c. 21 Salmon Fishing
 c. 22 An Act to make more effectual, An Act to prevent the maiming of cattle
 c. 24 St Werburgh's Church, Dublin

4 Geo. 1 (1717)

 c. 5 Distress for Rent Act 1717
 c. 7 Acquisition of land
 c. 8 An Act to oblige all Officers to return a List of their Fees by a Day certain
 c. 9 An Act for reviving, continuing, and amending several statutes made in this Kingdom heretofore temporary
 c. 13 Costs in certain actions
 c. 15 An Act for the better regulating the Town of Galway, and for the strengthening the Protestant Interest therein
 c. 16 An act for the better regulating the Corporation of the City of Kilkenny, and strengthening the Protestant Interest therein, and punishing Aldermen Robert Connell, for withdrawing himself with the Books and Papers belonging to the said Corporation

6 Geo. 1 (1719)

 c. 3 An Act for continuing and amending an Act, intituled, An Act to make the Militia of this Kingdom more useful
 c. 5 Prohibition of Disturbance of Worship Act 1719
 c. 6 An Act to prevent Delays in Writs of Error, and for the further Amendments of the Law
 c. 10 An Act for the better regulating the Parish Watches, and amending the High Ways in this Kingdom, and for the preventing the Misapplication of Publick Money
 c. 16 River Dodder Act 1719

1721–1730

8 Geo. 1 (1721)

 c. 2 Distress for Rent Act 1721
 c. 5 Boundaries Act 1721
 c. 6 An Act for the further amendment of the law, and for continuing and amending several acts near expiring
 c. 15 Registration of Deeds Act 1721

10 Geo. 1 (1723)

 c. 3 An Act for continuing and amending an Act, intituled, An Act for the better regulating the Parish Watches, and amending the High Ways in this Kingdom; and for the preventing the Misapplication of Publick Money: and also for establishing a regular Watch in the City of Dublin; and to prevent Mischiefs which may happen by Graving Ships in the River Lissey
 c. 5 Mining Leases Act 1723
 c. 6 An Act for explaining and amending an Act, intituled, An Act for real Union and Division of Parishes; and for confirming an Exchange made of a Piece of Ground, whereon the Parish-church and Vicarage-house of the Parish of Saint Anne in the Suburbs of the City of Dublin was by a former Act of Parliament directed to be built, for another Piece of Ground; and for appropriating such other Piece of Ground to the same Uses c. 10 Sale of Livestock Act 1723

12 Geo. 1 (1725)

 c. 3 Marriage Act 1725
 c. 4 Sheriffs Act 1725
 c. 9 An Act for the more effectual and better regulating of Free-Schools, and for rebuilding and repairing of Churches1 Geo. 2 (1727)

 c. 8 Privilege of Parliament
 c. 9 An Act for the further regulating the Election of Members of Parliament, and preventing the irregular Proceedings of Sheriffs and other Officers in electing and returning such Members - known as the "Disenfranchising Act"
 c. 20 An Act for regulating the Admissions of Barristers at Law, six Clerks, and Attorneys, and of other Persons, into Offices and Employments; and for preventing Papists practicing as Solicitors: and for further strengthening the Protestant Interest in this Kingdom3 Geo. 2 (1729)

 c. 1 For granting to his majesty a further additional duty on wine, strong waters, brandy, and spirits
 c. 2 For granting and continuing to his majesty, an additional duty on beer, ale, strong waters, wine, tobacco, and other goods and merchandises, therein mentioned.
 c. 3 For the encouragement of tillage
 c. 4 Perjury Act 1729
 c. 5 For continuing several temporary statutes made in this kingdom, now near expiring.
 c. 6 For allowing further time to persons in offices to qualify themselves, pursuant to an act, entitled, an act to prevent the further growth of Popery.
 c. 7 For the better discovery of judgements in the courts of king's bench, common pleas, and exchequer, at Dublin, and for the greater security of purchasers.
 c. 8 To enable his majesty to purchase in the respective interests of the several persons entitled to the houses and grounds adjoining to the new parliament house.
 c. 9 Sheriffs Act 1729
 c. 10 For explaining and amending an act, entitled, an act to prevent the disorders that may happen by the marching of soldiers, and for providing carriages for the baggage of soldiers in their march.
 c. 11 For the better keeping of churches in repair.
 c. 12 For supplying a defect in an act for rendering more effectual an act for the better enabling the clergy
 c. 13 City of Dublin Act 1729
 c. 14 To prevent unlawful combinations of workmen, artificers, and labourers employed in the several trades and manufactures of this kingdom, and for the better payment of their wages, as also to prevent abuses in making bricks and ascertain their dimensions.
 c. 15 Trial of criminals
 c. 16 For better regulating the office of justice of the peace in this kingdom.
 c. 17 For the better enabling the governors of the workhouse of the city of Dublin to provide for and employ the poor therein, and for the more effectual punishment of vagabonds.
 c. 18 For repairing the road leading from the city of Dublin to Kilcullen Bridge, in the county of Kildare.
 c. 19 For repairing the road leading from the city of Dublin to the town of Navan, in county Meath.
 c. 20 Relief of Insolvent Debtors
 c. 21 Ballast Offices Act 1729
 c. 22 For explaining and amending an act made in the sixth year of his late majesty King George I, entitled an act for erecting and continuing lights in the city of Dublin and the several liberties adjoining, and also in the cities of Cork and Limerick and liberties thereof. Text of act on Google Books
 c. 23 Dr. Steven's Hospital Act 1729  Text of act on Google Books

1731–1740

5 Geo. 2 (1731)

 c. 4 Security of Trade Act 1731
 c. 9 Land improvement
 c. 11 Inland Navigation Act 1731

7 Geo. 2 (1733)

 c. 5 Solicitors
 c. 6 An Act to prevent Persons converted from the Popish to the Protestant Religion, and married to Popish Wives, or educating their Children in the Popish Religion, from acting as Justices of the Peace c. 9 Spinners Act 1733
 c. 14 Relief of mortgages

9 Geo. 2 (1735)

 c. 3 An Act for the better regulating of Juries c. 6 An Act for continuing and amending several Statutes now near expiring c. 7 Timber Act 1735
 c. 8 Tippling Act 1735
 c. 9 Gauge and measure of beer barrels
 c. 11 An Act for the more effectual preventing clandestine Marriages c. 25 City of Cork Act 1735

11 Geo. 2 (1737)

 c. 5 Privilege of Parliament
 c. 6 An Act that all Proceedings in Courts of justice within this Kingdom shall be in the English language (still in force in UK)
 c. 7 An Act for the more effectual preventing the Enlisting of His Majesty's Subjects to serve as Soldiers in foreign Service without His Majesty's License13 Geo. 2 (1739)
 c. 4 "An Act for continuing several temporary statutes."
 c. 5 "An Act to continue and amend an ACT, made in the ninth year of the reign of His Present Majesty, intituled, An Act for the better regulating of juries."
 c. 6 "An act to explain, amend, and make more effectual an Act, passed in the seventh Year of the Reign of his late Majesty King William the Third of glorious Memory, intituled, An Act for the better securing the Government by disarming Papists"
 c. 7 "An Act for allowing further time to persons in offices or employments to qualify themselves, pursuant to an Act, intituled, An Act to prevent the further growth of Popery"
 c. 8 "An Act for the more effectual preventing of excessive and deceitful gaming."
 c. 9 "An Act for explaining and amending, An Act for the relief of mortgagees, and for the perpetuating the testimony of witnesses in suits in equity; and for impowering the Dean and Chapter of the Holy-Trinity or Christ-Church Cublin, to grant to His Majesty for any term of years, the rooms over the room commonly called the Exchequer-Chamber, and other rooms therein mentioned; and for amending a misnomer in An Act to enable Charles Coote, Esq; to raise portions for younger children."
 c. 10 "An Act to explain and amend an Act, passed in the sixth year of the reign of His late Majesty, King George the First, intituled, An Act for the better regulating the Parish-Watches, and amending the high-ways in this Kingdom, and for preventing the misapplication of public money."
 c. 11 "An Act for the further improvement of the hempen and flaxen manufactures of this Kingdom."
 c. 12 "An Act for continuing and amending the laws now in force, in relation to butter and tallow, and the casks in which such goods are to be made up, and for the curing of hides, and making up beef and pork for exportation; and for preventing the destruction of salmon."

1741–1750

15 Geo. 2 (1741)

 c. 7 Re partnerships c. 8 Distress for Rent Act 1741
 c. 10 Mining Leases Act 1741

17 Geo. 2 (1743)

 c. 4 Transportation
 c. 5 Slaughter of Cattle Act 1743
 c. 8 Truck Act 1743
 c. 10 An Act to prevent the pernicious Practice of burning Land, and for the more effectual destroying of Vermin19 Geo. 2 (1745)

 c. 7 An Act for the more effectual preventing his Majesty's Subjects from entering into foreign Service; and for publishing an Act of the seventh Year of King William the Third, intituled, An Act to prevent foreign Education c. 11 An Act for the better regulating Elections of Members of Parliament c. 12 Municipal Corporations Act 1745
 c. 13 An Act for annulling all Marriages to be celebrate by any Popish Priest between Protestant and Protestant, or between Protestant and Papist; and to amend and make more effectual an Act passed in this Kingdom in the sixth Year of the Reign of her late Majesty Queen Anne, intituled, An Act for the more effectual preventing the taking away and marrying Children against the Wills of their Parents or Guardians21 Geo. 2 (1747)

 c. 10 Newtown Act An Act to amend and make more effectual an Act, intituled, An Act for better regulating Elections of Members to serve in Parliament, and for the more effectual quieting of Corporations, and securing the Rights of Persons, who have been or shall be elected into the Offices of Alderman and Burgesses within any Corporation of this Kingdom23 Geo. 2 (1749)

 c. 9 Mining Leases Act 1749
 c. 10 An Act for explaining and making more effectual an Act, intituled, An Act for the more effectual preventing clandestine Marriages; and another Act passed in the twelfth Year of his late Majesty's Reign, intituled, an Act to prevent Marriages by degraded Clergymen and Popish Priests, and for preventing Marriages consummated from being avoided by Pre-Contracts, and for the more effectual punishing of Bigamy c. 13 Sheriffs
 c. 15 Buying and selling cattle and sheep in markets
 c. 18 Mercer's Hospital Act 1749
 c. 19 St. Mary's Parish Act 1749

1751–1760

25 Geo. 2 (1751)

 c. 8 Apprentices Act 1751
 c. 12 Enforcement of Court Orders Act 1751
 c. 13 Distress for Rent Act 1751
 c. 15 Weights and Measures Act 1751
 c. 23 Cork Infirmary &c. Act 1751

29 Geo. 2 (1755)

 c. 5 An Act to prohibit the Return into this Kingdom of such of his Majesty's Subjects as now are, or at any Time hereafter shall be, in the Service of the French King c. 6 An Act for better regulating Juries c. 8 Apprentices Act 1755
 c. 12 Re unlawful combinations, threatening letters, destruction of carriages, and arson c. 13 City of Dublin Act 1755
 c. 14 An Act for removing Doubts touching the Presentments of Money in the court of King's Bench, and for raising of Money for building and repairing Houses of Correction c. 15 Sheriffs Act 1755

33 Geo. 2 (1759)

 c. 14 Business of bankers
 c. 16 Re the corporation and magistrates of the City of Dublin1761–1770

1 Geo. 3 (1761)

 c. 8 Hospitals Act 1761
 c. 9 Gold and Silver Thread Act 1761
 c. 14 Royal College of Physicians Act 1761
 c. 17 Municipal Corporations Act 1761
 c. 18 City of Cork Act 1761

3 Geo. 3 (1763)

 c. 16 Charities
 c. 19 Riot Act 1763
 c. 28 Criminal Justice
 c. 29 Burning of land

5 Geo. 3 (1765)

 c. 10 Burning of land
 c. 17 Timber Act 1765
 c. 20 County Hospitals Act 1765
 c. 21 Practice in trials for high treason
 c. 22 Local Government (Dublin and Drogheda) Act 1765
 c. 24 City of Cork Act 1765

7 Geo. 3 (1767)

 c. 8 County Hospitals (Amendment) Act 1767
 c. 15 Dublin Society Act 1767
 c. 20 Timber Act 1767

11 Geo. 3 (1770)

 c. 6 Burning of Bricks (Dublin) Act 1770
 c. 7 Obstruction of Trade Act 1770

1771–1780

11 & 12 Geo. 3 (1771–72)

 c. 11 Re the Foundling Hospital and Workhouse, Dublin c. 13 City of Dublin Act 1771
 c. 21 An Act to encourage the reclaiming of unprofitable bogs c. 23 Cork Infirmary Act 1771
 c. 24 Limerick Navigation Act 1771
 c. 25 Partnerships
 c. 28 Lime Kilns (Dublin) Act 1771
 c. 31 Grand Canal
 c. 34 Criminal justice

13 & 14 Geo. 3 (1773)

 c. 43 Meath Hospital Act 1773

14 & 15 Geo. 3 (1774)

 c. 48 Life Assurance Act 1774

15 & 16 Geo. 3 (1775)

 c. 20 City of Dublin Act 1775
 c. 21 Tumultuous Risings Act 1775
 c. 24 City of Dublin (No. 2) Act 1775
 c. 26 Timber Act 1775
 c. 31 Meath Hospital Act 1775

17 & 18 Geo. 3 (1777–78)

 c. 15 County Hospitals Act 1777
 c. 35 Timber Act 1777
 c. 36 Tumultuous Risings (Extension) Act 1777
 c. 38 City of Cork Act 1777
 c. 44 Swearing into office of Lord Mayor of Dublin
 c. 45 Outlawries
 c. 46 Harcourt Street Act 1777
 c. 47 St. Mary's Parish Act 1777
 c. 49 Leases for Lives Act 1777

19 & 20 Geo. 3 (1779–80)

 c.  Simpson's Hospital Estate Act 1779
 c. 5 Lottery
 c. 13 City of Dublin Act 1779
 c. 19 Obstruction of Trade Act 1779
 c. 30 Tenantry Act 1779
 c. 38 Vexatious and frivolous arrests

1781–1790

21 & 22 Geo. 3 (1781–82)

 c. 11 Habeas Corpus Act 1781 (still in force in UK)
 c. 12 Dublin Leases Act 1781
 c. 13 St. John's Hospital Limerick Act 1781
 c. 16 Bank of Ireland Act 1781
 c. 20 State Debts Act 1781
 c. 27 Leases by Schools Act 1781
 c. 48 Calendar Act 1781 (extended the Calendar (New Style) Act 1750 to Ireland)
 c. 50 Courts
 c. 51 Criminal Justice

23 & 24 Geo. 3 (1783–84)

 c. 12 Prosperous Markets Act 1783
 c. 14 Admiralty Act 1783
 c. 20 Obstruction of Trade Act 1783
 c. 22 Funds in Chancery
 c. 23 Plate Assay Act 1783
 c. 39 Timber Act 1783
 c. 52 City of Waterford Act 1783
 c. 57 Rotunda Hospital Act 1783

25 Geo. 3 (1785)

 c. 36 Sheriffs Act 1785
 c. 43 Parnell Square Acr 1785
 c. 47 Registration of Deeds Act 1785
 c. 49 Ecclesiastical Lands Act 1785
 c. 53 State Debts Act 1785
 c. 55 Leases by Schools Act 1785
 c. 62 Leases for Corn Mills Act 1785

26 Geo. 3 (1786)

 c. 19 Dublin Port
 c. 24 Forcible Entry Act 1786
 c. 28 City of Cork Act 1786
 c. 31 Writ of scire facias
 c. 43 Pawnbrokers Act 1786
 c. 57 Dublin Theatres Act 1786
 c. 60 Naas Canal

27 Geo. 3 (1787)

 c. 15 Riot Act 1787
 c. 25 Pilots Act 1787
 c. 35 Game Act 1787
 c. 41 Weights and Measures Act 1787

28 Geo. 3 (1788)

 c. 24 Election of Lord Justice and Governor of Ireland
 c. 38 Courthouses and Gaols Act 1788
 c. 49 Pawnbrokers Act 1788
 c. 50 City of Dublin Act 1788

29 Geo. 3 (1789)
 c. 1 Taxation : National Debt: Various duties.
 c. 2 Taxation: National Debt: Various duties
 c. 3 Taxation: National Debt: Various duties
 c. 4 Taxation: National Debt: Various duties
 c. 5 Taxation: National Debt: Various duties
 c. 6 Taxation: National Debt: Various duties
 c. 7 Trade with United States
 c. 8 Postage
 c. 9 Stamp duties
 c. 10 Tobacco duties
 c. 11 Mutiny
 c. 12 Duties under treaty with France
 c. 13 Linen and hempen manufactures
 c. 14 Licence duties
 c. 15 Carriage duties
 c. 16 Hawkers and pedlars licences
 c. 17 Wine duties: Tax on absentee officials
 c. 18 Sundry duties
 c. 19 Duties on Malt etc.
 c. 20 Postage
 c. 21 Stamp duties
 c. 22 Mutiny
 c. 23 Roads from Dublin to Dunleer
 c. 24 Roads in Dublin
 c. 25 Revenue
 c. 26 First fruits
 c. 27 Churches and glebes
 c. 28 Forfeited recognizances
 c. 29 Parliamentary registration of freeholders
 c. 30 Commons Act 1789
 c. 31 Canal in Lough Neagh
 c. 32 Extension of time for taking oaths
 c. 33 Inland Navigation Act 1789
 c. 34 Linen and hempen manufactures
 c. 35 Grant for Record Office and law courts
 c. 36 Grant for agriculture and manufactures
 c. 37 Import duties in Dublin
 c. 38 Duties on spices
 c. 39 Grand Canal
 c. 40 Expiring Laws Continuance
 c. 41 Grant for charitable purposes
 c. 42 Watercourses and water pipes in towns

30 Geo. 3 (1790)

 c. 1  Taxation: National Debt
 c. 2  Taxation: National Debt
 c. 3  Various duties
 c. 4  Various duties
 c. 5  Various duties
 c. 6  Various duties
 c. 7  Duties under treaty with France
 c. 8  Linen and hempen manufactures
 c. 9  Remuneration of coroners
 c. 10 Duties on carriages
 c. 11 Licence duties
 c. 12 Tobacco duties
 c. 13 Trade with the United States
 c. 14 Hawkers and pedlars licences
 c. 15 Postage
 c. 16 Stamp duties
 c. 17 Parliamentary registration continuance
 c. 18 Mutiny
 c. 19 Dublin streets: road to Mullingar
 c. 20 Royal Canal
 c. 21 Extension of time for taking oaths
 c. 22 Revenue
 c. 23 Bankruptcy law
 c. 24 Sea fisheries continuance
 c. 25 Borrowing powers of Harbour Commissioners
 c. 26 Bounties on linen
 c. 27 Grants for charities: Rotunda Hospital
 c. 28 Grants for agriculture and manufactures
 c. 29 Guardianship of infants
 c. 30 Corn trade: Price of bread
 c. 31 Bridge in Derry
 c. 32 Transportation
 c. 33 Port duties in Dublin
 c. 34 Endowed Schools Commission continuance
 c. 35 Peace Preservation Act continuance
 c. 36 Trustees of charities: Borrowing
 c. 37 Inland navigation
 c. 38 Road in Tipperary and Kilkenny
 c. 39 Borough of Drogheda Act 1790
 c. 40 Boyne Navigation Act 1790
 c. 41 Funds in Chancery: The Accountant - General
 c. 42 Dublin streets : Island Bridge
 c. 43 Down Cathedral
 c. 44 Road in Kilkenny and Tipperary
 c. 45 Expiring Laws Continuance
 c. 46 Road in Westmeath
 c. 47 Road from Limerick to Cork
 Sess. 2 c. 1 Extension of time for taking oaths

1791–1800

31 Geo. 3 (1791)

 c. 1 Taxation: National debt: Lotteries
 c. 2 Taxation: National debt: Lotteries
 c. 3 Tax on salaries: Duties and licences
 c. 4 Trade with the United States
 c. 5 Tobacco, sugar and coffee trades
 c. 6 Grant for agriculture and manufactures
 c. 7 Grant for charities
 c. 8 Grant for linen manufactures
 c. 9 Export bounties
 c. 10 Postage
 c. 11 Clerks of the Crown and peace in Dublin
 c. 12 Stamp duties
 c. 13 Spirit licences
 c. 14 Linen and hempen manufactures
 c. 15 Duty on imported malt
 c. 16 Revenue
 c. 17 Prisoners (Rescue) Act 1791
 c. 18 Perjury Act 1791
 c. 19 Ecclesiastical improvements
 c. 20 Insurance of lottery tickets
 c. 21 Relief of insolvent debtors
 c. 22 Bank of Ireland Act 1791
 c. 23 Against exporting implements or machinery
 c. 24 City of Cork Act 1791
 c. 25 Recognizances
 c. 26 Corn trade with Great Britain
 c. 27 Tanning: Shoes and boots
 c. 28 Mutiny
 c. 29 Salaries of assistant barristers
 c. 30 Trials at Nisi Prius
 c. 31 Execution of civil bills decrees
 c. 32 Actions of slander
 c. 33 Price of coals in Dublin
 c. 34 Apothecaries' Hall Act 1791
 c. 35 School of physic
 c. 36 Parliamentary election petitions
 c. 37 Extension of time for taking oaths
 c. 38 Commons Act 1791
 c. 39 Mines Act 1791
 c. 40 Landlord and tenant: Cutting trees
 c. 41 Endowed Schools Commission Continuance
 c. 42 Inland navigation: Grand Canal
 c. 43 Against horse racing near Dublin
 c. 44 Expiring Laws Continuance
 c. 45 Merrion Square Act 1791
 c. 46 Armagh observatory 
 c. 47 Inland Navigation Act 1791
 c. 48 Baronies (Donegal and Meath) Act 1791
 c. 49 Roads in Westmeath
 c. 50 Roads in Dublin
 c. 51 Road from Dublin to Mullingar

32 Geo. 3 (1792)

 c. 1 Taxation: National Debt
 c. 2 Taxation: National Debt
 c. 3 Trade with the United States
 c. 4 Grant for linen manufactures
 c. 5 Regulation of bounties
 c. 6 Grant for charitable purposes
 c. 7 Tobacco trade
 c. 8 Stamp duties
 c. 9 Mutiny
 c. 10 Postage
 c. 11 Lotteries
 c. 12 Explaining certain deeds of trust
 c. 13 Erne Navigation Act 1792
 c. 14 Dublin Society Act 1792
 c. 15 Inland navigation
 c. 16 Constabulary
 c. 17 Revenue
 c. 18 The King's Inns
 c. 19 Spirit licences
 c. 20 Import duty on corn
 c. 21 Roman Catholic relief: Repeals
 c. 22 Roman Catholic relief: Indemnity
 c. 23 Sea fisheries
 c. 24 The Hibernian Mine Company
 c. 25 Forfeited recognizances
 c. 26 Royal Canal Docks
 c. 27 Transportation and imprisonment.
 c. 28 Building churches.
 c. 29 Tolls Act 1792
 c. 30 Post roads.
 c. 31 Licence in mortmain
 c. 32 Mortgages to aliens.
 c. 33 Extension of time for taking oaths.
 c. 34 Estate of the Bishop of Cork
 c. 35 City of Dublin Act 1792
 c. 36 Roads: Kinnegad to Athlone
 c. 37 Roads: Dublin to Malahide
 c. 38 Road in the Queen's County
 c. 39 Road in Kilkenny
 c. 40 Expiring Laws Continuance
 c. 41 Creditors of Robert Brook

33 Geo. 3 (1793)

 c. 1 Alien Act
 c. 2 Importation of arms and ammunition
 c. 3 Indemnity
 c. 4 Taxation: National Debt
 c. 5 Taxation: National Debt
 c. 6 Bounties on exporting sugar
 c. 7 Trade with the United States
 c. 8 Regulation of bounties
 c. 9 Grant for charitable purposes
 c. 10 Newry navigation
 c. 11 Tobacco trade
 c. 12 Linen and hempen manufacture
 c. 13 Dublin Society Act 1793
 c. 14 Hearth duty
 c. 15 Stamp duties
 c. 16 Mutiny
 c. 17 Postage
 c. 18 Lotteries
 c. 19 Castlecomer and Kilkenny Road
 c. 20 Newcastle, Limerick, and Cork Road
 c. 21 Roman Catholic relief
 c. 22 Militia
 c. 23 Payment of wages in the Navy
 c. 24 Dublin baking trade
 c. 25 Improvement of land: Tithes
 c. 26 Dublin and Malahide Road
 c. 27 Morgan's charity
 c. 28 Allowances to families of militiamen
 c. 29 Convention Act
 c. 30 Correspondence with the French enemy
 c. 31 Trade with the East Indies
 c. 32 Roads in Queen's County, &c.
 c. 33 Militia: Exemption for University students
 c. 34 The Civil List: Crown property
 c. 35 The Marshalsea in Dublin
 c. 36 Spirit licences
 c. 37 Revenue
 c. 38 Admission of freemen: Mandamus
 c. 39 Treasury bills
 c. 40 Price of coals in Dublin
 c. 41 Parliament: Offices under the Crown
 c. 42 Relief of insolvent debtors
 c. 43 Criminal law: Libel
 c. 44 The King's Inns
 c. 45 Trials for treason committed out of the realm
 c. 46 Post roads in Dublin
 c. 47 Price of coals in Cork
 c. 48 Suit as to an advowson
 c. 49 Crown property
 c. 50 Fisheries
 c. 51 Indemnity as to tests
 c. 52 Loans to traders
 c. 53 St. George's Parish Act 1793
 c. 54 City of Dublin Act 1793
 c. 55 Marine mutiny
 c. 56. Grand jury presentments and vestry cess in Dublin City

34 Geo. 3 (1794)
 c. 1 Hearth duty
 c. 2 Postage
 c. 3 Stamps
 c. 4 National Debt: Various duties
 c. 5 National Debt: Trade duties
 c. 6 Building of Law Courts
 c. 7 County treasurers
 c. 8 Fire in ships in Dublin
 c. 9 Water supply in cities and towns
 c. 10 Revenue
 c. 11 Expiring Laws Continuance
 c. 12 Relief of two insolvent debtors
 c. 13 Militia
 c. 14 Aiding the French enemy
 c. 15 Dublin Society Act 1794
 c. 16 Expiring Laws Continuance
 c. 17 Linen and hempen manufactures
 c. 18 Court of Conscience in Dublin
 c. 19 Mutiny
 c. 20 Irish Musical Fund Act 1794
 c. 21 Duties on hides
 c. 22 Roman Catholic relief: Fees
 c. 23 Expiring Laws Continuance
 c. 24 Expiring Laws Continuance
 c. 25 Bounties on exporting linen
 c. 26 Town of Wexford Act 1794

35 Geo. 3 (1795)

 c. 1 Hearth duty
 c. 2 Families of militiamen
 c. 3 Duties
 c. 4 Duties etc.
 c. 5 Militia
 c. 6 National Debt
 c. 7 Grand jury presentments
 c. 8 Militia
 c. 9 Stamp duties
 c. 10 Trade with the United States
 c. 11 Postage
 c. 12 Pre-Union Irish Statutes (Commencement) Act 1795 (short title in the Republic of Ireland); Acts of Parliament (Commencement) Act (Ireland) 1795 (short title in the United Kingdom)
 c. 13 Indemnity
 c. 14 Mutiny
 c. 15 Export bounties
 c. 16 Repeal of Road Acts
 c. 17 Portumna Bridge
 c. 18 Audit of public accounts
 c. 19 Brewers
 c. 20 Spirit licences
 c. 21 Maynooth College Act 1795
 c. 22 School of Physic
 c. 23 Ecclesiastical Lands Act 1795
 c. 24 Arms
 c. 25 Courts of Justice (Dublin) Act 1795
 c. 26 Against exporting starch
 c. 27 Broad-wheeled vehicles
 c. 28 Collection of Revenue Act 1795
 c. 29 Parliamentary elections
 c. 30 Relief of insolvent debtors
 c. 31 Relief of Peter Adams
 c. 32 Tithes
 c. 33 Fisheries
 c. 34 Dublin grand jury presentments
 c. 35 Regulation of lotteries
 c. 36 Dublin police
 c. 37 Exchequer bills
 c. 38 Post roads
 c. 39 Confirming grants made under the Great Seal of England
 c. 40 Extension of time for taking oaths
 c. 41 Revenue
 c. 42 Trade of bakers: Assize of bread
 c. 43 Dublin and Mullingar Road
 c. 44 Grand Canal
 c. 45 Speaker of the House of Commons
 c. 46 Supply of copies of statutes
 c. 47 Dublin and Ratoath Road
 c. 48 Town of New Ross Act 1795

36 Geo. 3 (1796)

 c. 1 National Debt: Charges on Bank of Ireland
 c. 2 Duties and bounties
 c. 3 Duties and bounties
 c. 4 Road in Tipperay
 c. 5 Trade with the United States
 c. 6 Indemnity for suppressing the insurrections
 c. 7 Post Office
 c. 8 Prohibition on exporting food
 c. 9 County infirmaries
 c. 10 Duties on hides
 c. 11 Postage
 c. 12 County treasurers
 c. 13 Road in Waterford
 c. 14 Mutiny
 c. 15 Hearth duty
 c. 16 Grants for agriculture, &c.
 c. 17 Stamp duties
 c. 18 Lighthouses
 c. 19 Prohibition on exporting tallow
 c. 20 Insurrections: Arms
 c. 21 Sugar
 c. 22 Sites for barracks
 c. 23 Municipal elections
 c. 24 Militia
 c. 25 Civil Bill Courts
 c. 26 Judges' salaries: Absence from circuit
 c. 27 Conspiracy to murder
 c. 28 Corn bounties in Dublin
 c. 29 Competent witnesses: Petty larceny
 c. 30 Dublin police, and pawnbrokers
 c. 31 Execution of women for high treason
 c. 32 The Whiteboy Act: County and city of Dublin
 c. 33 Militia
 c. 34 Expiring Laws Continuance
 c. 35 Revenue
 c. 36 Repairs of roads
 c. 37 Silk manufacture
 c. 38 Distress Act 1796
 c. 39 Inferior courts
 c. 40 Spirit licences
 c. 41 Sites for court-houses and gaols
 c. 42 Arms
 c. 43 Exporting bread
 c. 45 Woollen and cotton manufactures
 c. 46 Extension of time for taking oaths
 c. 47 Linen and hempen manufactures
 c. 48 Naturalization
 c. 49 Exchequer bills
 c. 50 Encroachments on commons
 c. 51 Lighting and cleansing towns
 c. 52 Sea fisheries
 c. 53 Earl of Athlone's annuity
 c. 54 Dublin wide streets
 c. 55 Roads: Grand juries
 c. 56 Navy pay and pensions
 c. 57 Canal Bridges Act 1796
 c. 58 Friendly societies
 c. 59 Dublin and Navan Road
 c. 60 Hutchinson's charity

37 Geo. 3 (1797)

 c. 1 Habeas corpus suspension
 c. 2 Volunteers
 c. 3 Taxation: National Debt, Duties etc.
 c. 4 Taxation: National Debt
 c. 5 Bounties
 c. 6 Bounties and drawbacks
 c. 7 Militia
 c. 8 Leather trade: Duties
 c. 9 Hearth duty
 c. 10 Malicious injuries in county Armagh
 c. 11 Postage
 c. 12 Stamps
 c. 13 Mutiny
 c. 14 Sugar duty
 c. 15 Trade with the United States
 c. 16 Distillers
 c. 17 Wicklow gold mining by the Treasury
 c. 18 Fixing the price of salt
 c. 19 Militia
 c. 20 Pay of Militia officers
 c. 21 An Act to amend the Game Laws c. 22 Paving in Dublin
 c. 23 Presentments for mail roads
 c. 24 Corn bounties
 c. 25 Bankrupts
 c. 26 Forging Bank notes and bills
 c. 27 National Debt: Sinking fund
 c. 28 Duties, &c.
 c. 29 Road from Dublin to Ratoath
 c. 30 Revenue
 c. 31 Importation during the war
 c. 32 National Debt: Loan
 c. 33 Malt
 c. 34 Dublin House of Industry
 c. 35 Presentments for roads
 c. 36 Trespass of animals
 c. 37 Chapels of ease
 c. 38 Insurrections : Arms
 c. 39 Indemnity for suppressing the insurrections
 c. 40 Incitement to Disaffection Act (Ireland) 1797
 c. 41 Grant to the Dublin Society
 c. 42 Tobacco
 c. 43 Stamp duties, &c.
 c. 44 Parish estates
 c. 45 Spirit licences
 c. 46 Distillers
 c. 47 Registration of freeholders: Election of minors void
 c. 48 Relief of insolvent debtors
 c. 49 Imprisonment for debt
 c. 50 Bank of Ireland Act 1797
 c. 51 Bank of Ireland: Restriction on cash payments
 c. 52 Coffee
 c. 53 Export and import
 c. 54 National Debt
 c. 55 Road from Dublin to Kilcullen
 c. 56 Borough of Drogheda Act 1797
 c. 57 Extension of time for taking oaths
 c. 58 Dublin hackney carriages
 c. 59 Dublin wide streets
 c. 60 Pension for the Princess Royal
 c. 61 Linen and hempen manufactures
 c. 62 Annuities for the widow and children of Rev. W. Hamilton, murdered
 c. 63 Annuities for the widow and children of Rev. Geo. Knipe, murdered

38 Geo. 3 (1798)

 c. 1 Militia
 c. 2 Quo Warranto Act 1798
 c. 3 Tyrone presentments
 c. 4 Importation of Portugal salt
 c. 5 Duties
 c. 6 Bounties on exportation
 c. 7 Newspapers: Seditious libels
 c. 8 Seducing soldiers
 c. 9 Hearth duty
 c. 10 National Debt
 c. 11 Malt duty
 c. 12 Coffee duty
 c. 13 Trade with the United States
 c. 14 Habease corpus suspension continuance
 c. 15 Postage
 c. 16 Alien Act Continuance
 c. 17 Voluntary contributions to the Exchequer
 c. 18 Stamp duties
 c. 19 Indemnity for suppressing the insurrections
 c. 20 Parliament: Demise of the Crown
 c. 21 Insurrections: Arms
 c. 22 Road in Cork
 c. 23 Leather trade
 c. 24 Sundry duties
 c. 25 Civil Bill Courts
 c. 26 Judges of assize may summon persons in execution, &c.
 c. 27 Mutiny
 c. 28 Road in Down and Antrim
 c. 29 Paper duties
 c. 30 Princess Royal's pension to be in British currency
 c. 31 Roads in Dublin County
 c. 32 Loans
 c. 33 Loans
 c. 34 Dublin House of Industry
 c. 35 Dublin workhouse, &c.
 c. 36 House of Commons: Disqualification by acceptance of office
 c. 37 Provision for quartering of foreign troops
 c. 38 Commissions of oyer and terminer in Dublin
 c. 39 Proctors' Bills of Costs
 c. 40 Irish Mine Company
 c. 41 Dublin bridge tolls
 c. 42 Sugar drawbacks and bounties
 c. 43 Grants for agriculture, &c.
 c. 44 Linen and hempen manufactures
 c. 45 Collection of duties
 c. 46 English militia serving in Ireland
 c. 47 Post Office
 c. 48 Desertion of merchant seamen
 c. 49 King's Inns Act 1798
 c. 50 Fines and recognizances
 c. 51 Distillers
 c. 52 Rectifing spirits
 c. 53 Forging Bank notes
 c. 54 Royal Canal Company
 c. 55 General pardon for the rebellion
 c. 56 Public accounts
 c. 57 Conspiracy to murder
 c. 58 Loan from the English to the Irish Treasury
 c. 59 Transportation
 c. 60 Corporations
 c. 61 Disqualifing parliamentary voters
 c. 62 Militia
 c. 63 Tobacco trade
 c. 64 Grant to the Foundling Hospital
 c. 65 Chairman of Quarter Sessions in Dublin
 c. 66 Annuity for Robert Boyd
 c. 67 Export and import
 c. 68 Commission of inquiry into losses by the rebellion
 c. 69 Annuity for the Prince of Mecklenburgh Strelitz
 c. 70 Annuity for Viscount Duncan
 c. 71 Annuity for Earl Saint Vincent
 c. 72 Quitrents and Crown lands
 c. 73 Spirit licences
 c. 74 Indemnity for suppressing the insurrections
 c. 75 Revenue
 c. 76 Extension of time for taking oaths
 c. 77 Attainder of Lord Edward FitzGerald, and two others, deceased
 c. 78 Transportation of certain rebels
 c. 79 Grants for the Grand Canal and Royal Canal
 c. 80 Requiring certain persons to surrender for trial for the rebellion
 c. 81 House of Commons journals
 c. 82 Insurrections: Arms
 c. 83 Road from Dublin to Kilcullen

39 Geo. 3 (1799)

 c. 1 Militia
 c. 2 Export bounties
 c. 3 Indemnity for suppressing the insurrections
 c. 4 Expiring Laws Continuance
 c. 5 Stamp duties
 c. 6 Mutiny
 c. 7 Taxation: National Debt
 c. 8 Taxation: National Debt, Duties etc.
 c. 9 Barony of Idrone
 c. 10 Postage
 c. 11 Suppressing the rebellion: Courts martial
 c. 12 Hearth duty
 c. 13 Trade with the United States
 c. 14 Arrears of tithes
 c. 15 Window tax
 c. 16 Civil Bill Courts
 c. 17 Waterford Infirmary Act 1799
 c. 18 Extension of time for taking oaths
 c. 19 Cathedrals used as parish churches
 c. 20 Duties on male servants, &c.
 c. 21 Coffee
 c. 22 Tobacco
 c. 23 Beer and spirits
 c. 24 Auctions, &c.
 c. 25 Loan from the English to the Irish Treasury
 c. 26 Sites for barracks
 c. 27 Sugar
 c. 28 Corporations
 c. 29 Fisheries
 c. 30 Militia
 c. 31 Militia may serve out of Ireland
 c. 32 Duties on home wines, &c.
 c. 33 Quitrents and Crown lands
 c. 34 Malt duties
 c. 35 Excise duties and licences
 c. 36 Transportation of rebels
 c. 37 Manufacture and sale of gunpowder
 c. 38 Expiring Laws Continuance
 c. 39 Duties on hides, vellum, &c.
 c. 40 Spirit licences
 c. 41 Distillers
 c. 42 Paper duty
 c. 43 Duty on goat skins
 c. 44 Stamp duties
 c. 45 Grant for agriculture, &c.
 c. 46 Road from Dublin to Ratoath
 c. 47 Road from Newcastle to Limerick
 c. 48 Small notes and bills
 c. 49 Families of militiamen
 c. 50 Indemnity for suppression of the rebellion
 c. 51 Inland fisheries
 c. 52 Road in Cork
 c. 53 City of Dublin Act 1799
 c. 54 Sugar
 c. 55 Gaol: Sessions held in the absence of a recorder
 c. 56 Dublin police, &c.
 c. 57 Bankrupts
 c. 58 Rectifying spirits
 c. 59 Soldiers on the march exempt from tolls
 c. 60 Stock Exchange (Dublin) Act 1799
 c. 61 Tanning
 c. 62 Game licences
 c. 63 Bank of England Act 1799
 c. 64 Treasury Bills, &c.
 c. 65 Commission to inquire into losses by the rebellion
 c. 66 Revenue
 c. 67 Enforcing recognizances

40 Geo. 3. (1800)

 c. 1 Militia
 c. 2 Revival of Act for martial law
 c. 3 Taxation: National Debt
 c. 4 Taxation: National Debt, Duties etc.
 c. 5 Extension of time for taking oaths
 c. 6 Suspension of distilling from corn
 c. 7 Mutiny
 c. 8 Postage
 c. 9 Duties on hides, &c.
 c. 10 Stamp duties
 c. 11 Sea fisheries
 c. 12 Militia
 c. 13 Trade with the United States
 c. 14 Duty on wine, &c.
 c. 15 Alien Act Continuance
 c. 16 Stamp duties, &c.
 c. 17 Silk manufacture
 c. 18 Habeas Corpus Act suspension
 c. 19 Repeal of 8 Ric. 2. c. 2. (Eng.), as to justices of assize
 c. 20 Regulation of bounties
 c. 21 Bankrupts
 c. 22 Bankers
 c. 23 Tithe agistment
 c. 24 Penalty for burning land
 c. 25 Sugar duty
 c. 26 Site of Newry Barracks
 c. 27 Maintenance of curates
 c. 28 Distilling
 c. 29 Summoning and returning of Peers and Commoners to sit in the United Parliament
 c. 30 Forfeited recognizances
 c. 31 Grants to the Dublin Society
 c. 32 Clare Infirmary
 c. 33 Rotunda Hospital Act 1800
 c. 34 Compensation for certain disfranchised boroughs
 c. 35 Charleton's estate
 c. 36 Woollen cloth
 c. 37 Belfast improvement
 c. 38 An Act for the Union of Great Britain and Ireland'' (still in force in UK)
 c. 39 Court of Exchequer Chamber
 c. 40 Dublin House of Industry
 c. 41 Londonderry Bridge
 c. 42 Relief of insolvent debtors
 c. 43 Revenue
 c. 44 Return of persons transported
 c. 45 Wine duties
 c. 46 First fruits
 c. 47 City of Dublin Act 1800
 c. 48 Road from Dublin to Knocksedan
 c. 49 Losses by the rebellion
 c. 50 Compensation for officials of the Parliament
 c. 51 Inland Navigation Act 1800
 c. 52 Collection of assessed taxes
 c. 53 Grants of certain pensions
 c. 54 Spirit licences
 c. 55 Distilling from sugar
 c. 56 Expiring Laws Continuance
 c. 57 Malt tax
 c. 58 Distilling from malt
 c. 59 Game licences
 c. 60 Treasury Bills, &c.
 c. 61 Dublin wide streets
 c. 62 Dublin watch: Paving: Pawnbrokers
 c. 63 Dealers' licences
 c. 64 Promissory notes and bills
 c. 65 Female Orphan House in Dublin
 c. 66 Association for discountenancing vice
 c. 67 Distillers
 c. 68 Excise permits
 c. 69 Judges' pensions: Allowances for circuit
 c. 70 Arrears of quitrent and Crown rent
 c. 71 Trespass of cattle
 c. 72 Juries: Remuneration of special jurors
 c. 73 Liffey walls
 c. 74 The circular road in Dublin
 c. 75 Commissioners of Charitable Donations
 c. 76 Paper duty
 c. 77 Tobacco
 c. 78 Tanning
 c. 79 Quarantine
 c. 80 Parliamentary elections: Polling in Derry and Coleraine
 c. 81 Compensation for unpaid tithes
 c. 82 Ecclesiastical residences
 c. 83 Building of churches and chapels
 c. 84 Royal College of Physicians, Ireland, Act 1800
 c. 85 Maynooth College Act 1800
 c. 86 Coffee
 c. 87 Auctions
 c. 88 Repairs of roads: Vestries
 c. 89 Indemnity for suppressing the rebellion
 c. 90 Leases for Cotton Manufacture Act 1800
 c. 91 Militia
 c. 92 Militia commanding officers
 c. 93 Roads in Waterford and Cork
 c. 94 Roads in Dublin, Kildare, Limerick and Cork
 c. 95 Roads in Limerick
 c. 96 Cork and Dublin coalyards
 c. 97 County of Louth Act 1800
 c. 98 Road from Tubber to Limerick
 c. 99 Sligo improvement
 c. 100 City of Cork Act 1800

See also

 List of Acts of the Oireachtas
 List of Acts of Parliament of the United Kingdom Parliament

References

Footnotes

1800
18th century in Ireland
Parliament of Ireland